The Kangly (康曷利; pinyin: Kānghélì; Middle Chinese (ZS): /kʰɑŋ-ɦɑt̚-liɪH/ or 康里 pinyin: Kānglĭ < MC-ZS: /kʰɑŋ-lɨX/; Karakhanid: قنكلى Kaγnï or قنكلى Kaŋlï, also spelled Qanglı, Kanly, Kangly, Qangli, Kangli or Kankali) were a Turkic people of Eurasia who were active since the Tang dynasty up to the Mongol Empire and Yuan dynasty.

Origins 
They may be related to the Kipchaks or Pechenegs, or they may have been a branch of the Kök Turks who were conquered by the Tang dynasty of China.

Historical references 

Kara-Khanid lexicographer Mahmud al-Kashgari mentioned a Kipchak chief surnamed Qanglı and simply glossed Qanglı as "a wagon for carrying load". Supposedly, they might be identified as or closely related to Kipchaks; or formed part of the Pechenegs.

Byzantine Emperor Constantine VII mentions three Pecheneg tribes collectively known as the Kangar in his De Administrando Imperio. Kangar is associated with Kang territory and probably with the Kangaris people and the city of Kangu Tarban, mentioned in the Kul Tigin inscription of the Orkhon Turkic peoples.

Still, the relationship between the Kanglys, the Kangars, and the Kangaris / Kengeres (allies of the Eastern Turkic Khaganate against the Western Turkic Khaganate), is still unclear.

They may have even been a branch of the Göktürks, who were conquered by the Tang dynasty of China..

The Tang dynasty historical text Tang Huiyao apparently distinguished the Kangheli from the Kang nation, also known as Kangju nation.

History 
After the fall of the Pecheneg Khanate in the early 10th century, the role of the Kanglys became prominent. Different Pontic Steppe's Turkic nomadic peoples, who might have been separate and distinct earlier, would eventually become assimilated into each other by the 13th century. The eastern grouping of Cumania was indeed known as Qanglı (Latin: Cangle).

Many Kangly warriors joined the Khwarezmid Empire in the 11th century. In 1175 some of them lived north of Lake Balkhash and transferred their allegiance from the Qara Khitai (Western Liao dynasty) to the Jin dynasty.

They were conquered by Genghis Khan's armies during the Mongol conquest of Central Asia in 1219–1223. All Kanglys in Bukhara who were taller than a wheel, were slain by the Mongols. Jochi subdued remnants who still lived in the land of the Kyrghyz and Kipchak steppes in 1225. Khwarizmi Kangly remnants submitted to Great Khan Ögedei after a long resistance under Jalal ad-Din Mingburnu against his general Chormaqan and governor Chin-temur. After the Mongol conquest, the remaining Kanglys were absorbed into other Turks and Mongols. Some of them who served in the Yuan dynasty became Kharchins.

There are Kangly clans among the Kazakhs, Uzbeks, Kyrgyz, Bashkirs, Nogais, and Karakalpaks.

Notable People 

 Hama (Yuan dynasty), an official of the Yuan dynasty of China
 Älihan Smaiylov, current prime minister of Kazakhstan

References

Citations

Sources
Rashiduddin Fazlullah's Jamiʻuʼt-tawarikh by Rashīd al-Dīn Ṭabīb, translated and edited by Wheeler McIntosh Thackston.
The Mongols - A History by Jeremiah Curtin.

See also
Kangar union
History of the central steppe

Turkic peoples of Asia
Nomadic groups in Eurasia

History of the Turkic peoples
Extinct Turkic peoples